The 2015–16 British and Irish Cup was the seventh season of the annual rugby union competition for second tier, semi-professional clubs from Britain and Ireland.  Worcester Warriors were the defending champions having won the 2014–15 final against Doncaster Knights 35–5 at Castle Park, Doncaster on 3 April 2015. There have been five different winners and six different losing finalists of the competition in the six seasons of its existence. The format of the competition was similar to last season with Scottish clubs not competing. This season the four Welsh teams are the reserve sides of the teams competing in the Pro 12 competition instead of clubs from the Welsh Premier Division.

Matches were played on the same weekends as the European Rugby Champions and Challenge cups.  First round matches began on 13 November 2015 and the final was held on 10 April 2016.

Competition format
The competition format is a pool stage followed by a knockout stage. The pool stage consists of five pools of four teams playing home and away matches. The top side in each pool, plus the three best runners-up, will progress to the knockout stage. The eight quarter-finalists will be ranked, with top four teams having home advantage. The four winning quarter-finalists will progress to the semi-final draw. Matches take place on the same weekends as the European Rugby Champions and Challenge cups.

Participating teams and locations
The allocation of teams is as follows:
  – twelve clubs from RFU Championship
  – four Irish provinces represented by 'A' teams
  – four Welsh regions represented by Premiership Select teams.

Pool stages

Pool 1

Postponed due to frozen pitch.  Game rescheduled to 20 February 2016.

Game rescheduled from 16 January 2016.

Pool 2

Pool 3

Pool 4

Pool 5

Knock-out stage
The eight qualifiers are seeded according to performance in the pool stage, and competed in the quarter-finals, which are held on the weekend of 11/12/13 March 2016. The four top seeds host the quarter-finals against the lower seeds, in a 1 v 8, 2 v 7, 3 v 6 and 4 v 5 format. However, if two teams have qualified from the same group then they cannot be drawn together despite the seeding. Hence Leinster A and Moseley were not drawn together leading to a 1 v 7, 2 v 8, 3 v 6, 4 v 5 format.

Teams are ranked by:
1 – competition points (4 for a win, 2 for a draw)
2 – where competition points are equal, greatest number of wins
3 – where the number of wins are equal, aggregate points difference
4 – where the aggregate points difference are equal, greatest number of points scored

Quarter-finals

Semi-finals

Final

Attendances

Individual statistics
 Note if players are tied on tries or points the player with the lowest number of appearances is placed first (if they have the same number of games, then the less minutes played will rank first). Also note that points scorers includes tries as well as conversions, penalties and drop goals. Appearance figures also include coming on as substitutes (unused substitutes not included).

Top points scorers

Top try scorers

Season records

Team
Largest home win — 50 pts
56 - 6 Yorkshire Carnegie at home to London Scottish on 13 December 2015
Largest away win — 40 pts
40 - 0 Doncaster Knights away to Connacht Eagles on 16 January 2015
Most points scored — 62
62 - 16 Bristol Rugby at home to Scarlets Premiership Select on 22 November 2015
Most tries in a match — 9 
Bristol Rugby at home to Scarlets Premiership Select on 22 November 2015
Most conversions in a match — 7 (x4)
Bristol Rugby at home to Scarlets Premiership Select on 22 November 2015
Doncaster Knights away to Newport Gwent Dragons Premiership Select on 19 December 2015
London Scottish at home to Ospreys Premiership Select on 16 January 2016
Leinster A away to Moseley on 16 January 2016
Most penalties in a match — 4 (x3) 
Cornish Pirates away to Nottingham Rugby on 22 November 2015
Rotherham Titans at home to Moseley on 20 December 2015
Newport Gwent Dragons Premiership Select away to Jersey on 16 January 2016
Most drop goals in a match — 1
Leinster A away to Rotherham Titans on 14 November 2015

Player
Most points in a match — 22
 Matthew Morgan for Bristol Rugby at home to Ulster Ravens on 23 January 2016
Most tries in a match — 4 (x2)
 Uili Kolo'ofai for Jersey away to Connacht Eagles on 12 December 2015
 Andy Saull for Yorkshire Carnegie at home to Munster A on 17 January 2016
Most conversions in a match — 7 (x3)
 Gavin Henson for Bristol Rugby at home to Scarlets Premiership Select on 22 November 2015
 Peter Lydon for London Scottish at home to Ospreys Premiership Select on 16 January 2016
 Cathal Marshal for Leinster A away to Moseley on 16 January 2016
Most penalties in a match — 4 (x2)
 Laurence May for Cornish Pirates away to Nottingham Rugby on 22 November 2015
 Rhys Jones for Newport Gwent Dragons Premiership Select away to Jersey on 16 January 2016
Most drop goals in a match — 1
 Ross Byrne for Leinster A away to Rotherham Titans on 14 November 2015

Attendances
Highest — 5,273
Bristol Rugby at home to Ulster Ravens on 23 January 2016
Lowest — 100 (x2)
Scarlets Premiership Select at home to Ulster Ravens on 21 November 2015
Connacht Eagles at home to Doncaster Knights on 16 January 2016
Highest Average Attendance — 4,999
Bristol Rugby
Lowest Average Attendance — 150
Connacht Eagles

References

External links
  Unofficial British and Irish Cup website - latest news, teams etc

British and Irish Cup
2015–16 rugby union tournaments for clubs
2015–16 RFU Championship
2015–16 in Irish rugby union
2015–16 in Welsh rugby union
2015–16 in British rugby union